Rice (translit. Ssal) is a 1963 South Korean drama film directed by Shin Sang-ok. The film was selected as the South Korean entry for the Best Foreign Language Film at the 39th Academy Awards, but was not accepted as a nominee.

Cast
Shin Young-kyun
Choi Eun-hee
Namkoong Won
Lee Ki-hong

Plot
The farmers of Muju, Cheonbuk Province, are not only poor, one year they don't even have enough water to irrigate their rice paddies. Despite many attempts to dig a canal to the Geum River, they fail every single time.

Throughout these difficulties, the villagers find the strength to endure, until at last the military coup of 1962 brings in a government that gives them the support they need to escape starvation and ruin.

See also
List of submissions to the 39th Academy Awards for Best Foreign Language Film
List of South Korean submissions for the Academy Award for Best Foreign Language Film

References

External links

1963 drama films
South Korean drama films
1960s Korean-language films
South Korean black-and-white films
Films directed by Shin Sang-ok